Rear Admiral Philip Schöultz  is a retired Rear Admiral in the South African Navy, who served as Flag Officer Fleet.

He joined the Navy in 1972 and served on minesweeper , the destroyer  and the frigate .

He served as SSO Personnel at the Strike Craft flotilla before being posted to Navy Headquarters in 1988. He served as SSO Surface Warfare, Sub Surface Warfare, Director Maritime Plans and Chief Director Maritime Strategy at Naval Headquarters He was promoted to rear admiral in January 2004.

He served as Chief Director Operational Development at the Joint Operations division until 2011 when he was appointed Flag Officer Fleet.

Honours and awards
He has been awarded the following:
 
 
 
 
 
 
 
 
 
 
 

He obtained a bachelor's degree in Military Sciences (BMil) at the Military Academy in 1975, and was awarded the Sword of Honour.

References

South African admirals
Living people
Year of birth missing (living people)